Ephestiodes is a genus of snout moths. It was described by Émile Louis Ragonot in 1887.

Species
Ephestiodes erasa Heinrich, 1956
Ephestiodes erythrella Ragonot, 1887
Ephestiodes gilvescentella Ragonot, 1887
Ephestiodes griseus Neunzig, 1990
Ephestiodes infimella Ragonot, 1887
Ephestiodes mignonella Dyar, 1908
Ephestiodes monticolus Neunzig, 1990
Ephestiodes noniella Dyar, 1914

References

Phycitinae
Pyralidae genera